Berliner Fussball Club Dynamo e. V., commonly abbreviated to BFC Dynamo or BFC, alternatively sometimes called Dynamo Berlin, is a German football club based in the locality of Alt-Hohenschönhausen of the borough of Lichtenberg of Berlin. BFC Dynamo was founded in 1966 from the football department of SC Dynamo Berlin and became one of the most successful clubs in East German football. The club is the record champion of East Germany with ten consecutive league championships from 1979 through 1988. BFC Dynamo competes in the fourth tier Regionalliga Nordost. The club enjoys a cross-city rivalry with 1. FC Union Berlin and a historical rivalry with SG Dynamo Dresden. The rivalry with Union Berlin is part of the Berlin derby.

History

Colours and crest
The colours of BFC Dynamo are claret and white. The colours were inherited from SC Dynamo Berlin and followed the claret colour scheme of SV Dynamo. BFC Dynamo has been playing in claret and white since the club's founding, with the exception of a period in the 1990s. The BFC Dynamo home kit has traditionally been a claret shirt, paired with claret or white shorts and socks. The team is occasionally nicknamed "die Weinroten", which means "the Clarets".

The BFC Dynamo away kit has traditionally been a white shirt, paired with claret or white shorts and socks. However, the team used green away shirts from the end of the 1960s until the mid-1970s. Green was the colour of the Volkspolizei, which was the official sponsor of BFC Dynamo during the East German era. The green away shirt was then exchanged for a white away shirt, paired with red or white shorts and socks. During the 1981–82 and 1982-83 seasons, the team used entirely red away kits. The red colour was then exchanged for claret.

The club was rebranded as FC Berlin on 19 February 1990 and subsequently adopted a new red and white colour scheme in the 1990–91 season. The red and white kit looked a lot like 1. FC Union Berlin in the eyes of the supporters. The club played in red and white home kits for most of the FC Berlin era, but wore a black and red striped home shirt, paired with black shorts and black socks from the 1996–97 season through the 1998–99 season. The club reverted to its original name on 3 May 1999 and consequently also later returned to its traditional colour scheme.

The crest of BFC Dynamo during the East German era featured a stylized "D" for SV Dynamo and the lettering "BFC" in red and yellow on a white background, surrounded by a yellow wreath. BFC Dynamo abandoned its East German crest when the club was rebranded as FC Berlin on 19 February 1990. The club used two different crests during the FC Berlin era. The first crest featured a stylized image of the roof of the Brandenburg Gate with the lettering "FCB" underneath and the club name "Fussballclub Berlin" in capital letters in white on a red background. It was only used during the spring of 1990. The second crest featured a stylized image of a football with the Brandenburg Gate on top and the lettering "FCB" and the club name "FC Berlin" in red on a white background.

BFC Dynamo reclaimed its East German crest when the club reverted to its original name on 3 May 1999. But the club was no longer in possession of the crest. The club had neglected to seek legal protection for its East German crest after German reunification. The neglect was likely due to managerial inexperience. Protection of trademarks was neither necessary nor common in East Germany. The crest was now owned by Peter Klaus-Dieter Mager, commonly known as "Pepe". Pepe Mager was a famous fan of Hertha and a fan merchandise dealer. The club tried to recover the crest from Mager though court action, without success. The ownership of the crest was instead passed on to Rayk Bernt and his company RA-BE Immobilien- und Handelsgesellschaft mbH.

BFC Dynamo continued to use the disputed crest on its kits and webpage. But the club would have to ask the owner of the crest every time it wanted to have a pennant made and was unable to exploit the commercial value of the crest for its own benefit. The legal situation around the crest would also have caused problems in the event of an advance to the Regionalliga, as the German football Association (DFB) required clubs to own their crests. In order establish independence, the club finally decided to adopt a new crest in 2009.

The new crest abandoned the traditional stylized "D" and the lettering "BFC", as they would have met legal obstacles. The new crest featured a black Berlin bear on claret and white stripes, together with the club name and the founding year. The first version of the new crest sparked controversy. The word "fußball" in the club name had been written in lower case with a double "s" instead of the graphene "ß". This was contrary to German spelling rules, where it is only permissible to write "fußball" with a double "s" when the word is written in upper case. Club President Norbert Uhlig ensured that there was absolutely no ulterior motive behind the spelling and claimed that the word had always been spelled like that on club pennants and scarfs. The Chairman of the Economic Council Peter Meyer later claimed that the spelling was a deliberate marketing ploy, in order to have new crest immediately known across Germany. A second version of the crest was soon made public, where the club name was written in upper case. The new crest has been used by BFC Dynamo since the 2009–10 season.

Ownership of the former crest
Many clubs in East Germany rushed to drop their East German names during the Peaceful revolution. BFC Dynamo was among the clubs to do so, in an attempt to distance the club from the Stasi. The club was rebranded as FC Berlin on 19 February 1990 and consequently abandoned its East German crest.

Pepe Mager was a famous fan of Hertha BSC and fan merchandise dealer. Mager had organized away trips for the fans Hertha in the early 1960s and was one of the founders of the notorious supporter group "Hertha-Frösche". He now sold his own fan merchandise from a mobile stand outside the Olympiastadion. Mager inquired with the register of associations in Charlottenburg in 1991 about all deleted names of East German clubs. He immediately found BFC Dynamo and saw business opportunities. Mager claimed that he first secured the former crest of BFC Dynamo for 80 D-Marks in 1992.

The name FC Berlin never became popular with the fans. Fans continued to identify themselves with the former name and crest. An overwhelming majority voted for the club to revert to its original name at the general meeting on 3 May 1999. Of the 135 present, 125 voted in favor, three against and seven abstained. BFC Dynamo thus reclaimed its East German crest, but the rights to the crest now belonged to Mager. Mager had registered the crest in his name at the German Patent and Trademark Office on 13 May 1997.

BFC Dynamo contacted Mager for a co-operation, but an agreement could not be reached. Mager held the opinion that the club should buy its merchandise from him, or simply buy the rights to the crest. He later informed the club that he had received interest from foreign buyers and offered the club to buy the rights. He claimed that the crest was worth 200,000 D-Marks. BFC Dynamo on the other hand claimed that the crest should legally belong to the club. The club sued Mager in court on 20 November 2000, but eventually lost the case. The club decided to suspend the legal dispute with Mager in the summer of 2001 and instead wanted to find a solution outside court. Mager was repeatedly exposed to minor threats from the environment around BFC Dynamo and eventually sold the crest to Rayk Bernt and his company RA-BE Immobilien- und Handelsgesellschaft mbH for a price of 50,000 D-Marks in June 2002.

Bernt was a close associate of André Sommer. Bernt and Sommer had assisted the club at the opening of the insolvency proceedings in 2001–2002.   Both were long time fans of BFC Dynamo. But the duo was controversial for their connections to Hells Angels. Bernt and Sommer were almost as restrictive towards the club when it came to the crest as Mager had been. Bernt organized the production of fan merchandise in his own regime. The club would have to ask his company every time it wanted to have a pennant made. Bernt and Sommer usually agreed, manufactured the pennant and then sold it at their own fan merchandise stand at the stadium. BFC Dynamo continued to use the crest and would at times be given ten percent of the revenues from their sales. The club eventually offered 5,000 Euros for the crest, but was turned down. Bernt demanded a seven-digit sum, according to former Club President Mario Weinkauf. The lawyer representing RA-BE Immobilien- und Handelsgesellschaft mbH allegedly claimed the crest was worth around 600,000 Euros at the time.

President Weinkauf planned to recover the rights to the former crest with the help of Thomas Thiel and the company Treasure AG before the general meeting on 23 June 2007. Thiel was a co-owner of Treasure AG, which was intended as a new major sponsor.  Bernt sold parts of the rights to the former crest to Thiel. The price was allegedly a six-digit sum. According to the plan, the club would be given the rights of use to the crest. The profits would thus go to the club. The club would pay a symbolic sum of 1 Euro per month for the rights of use. BFC Dynamo would then have a right of first refusal after the ten-year contract had expired and thus have the opportunity to eventually acquire ownership of the crest. However, Weinkauf was ultimately rejected by club members in a vote of no-confidence at the general meeting on 23 June 2007. Weinkauf would then be contacted by the former president of Tennis Borussia Berlin Peter Antony. Treasure AG became a sponsor of Tennis Borussia Berlin instead and  Weinkauf would later become president of the club.

Thiel sold his rights to the crest back to Bernt and his company BFC Dynamo Vermarktungsgesellschaft m.b.H in 2009. The rights to the old crest where subsequently controlled again by the company RA-BE Immobilien- und Handelsgesellschaft mbH. The company is controlled by Bernt, who sold occasional items with the former crest at his own webpage. However, RA-BE Immobilien- und Handelsgesellschaft mbH transferred the rights to AXXON AG in 2022. The rights to the crest were then fully held by company AXXON AG. In connection with the club's 57th anniversary, the Chairman of the Economic Council Peter Meyer revealed in an exclusive interview with Berliner Kurier that he has acquired the rights to the crest for the club through one of his companies. After more than 13 years, the traditional crest was finally back with the club. According to Berliner Kurier, a six-digit sum is said to have become due.

Championship star
The German Football League (DFL) introduced a system of championship stars in the 2004–05 season. The system was meant to honor the most successful teams in the Bundesliga by allowing teams to display stars on their shirts for the championships they have won. The system awarded one star for three titles, two stars for five titles, and three stars for ten titles. However, the system only counted titles won in the Bundesliga since the 1963–64 season. 
 
BFC Dynamo submitted an application to the DFL and the DFB on 9 August 2004 to receive three stars for its ten titles in the DDR-Oberliga. The club asked for equal rights and argued that the DFB had absorbed the German Football Association of the GDR (DFV) with all its statistics, international matches and goal scores. BFC Dynamo received support from Dynamo Dresden and 1. FC Magdeburg in its attempts to achieve recognition for East German titles.

The DFL responded that it was not the responsible body, but the DFB remained silent for a long time. The DFB eventually declared itself responsible and recommended BFC Dynamo to submit a formal application for a new title symbol in accordance with a relevant paragraph. BFC Dynamo commissoned a law firm in Mitte in January 2005 and sent a new letter to the DFB. The DFB announced that the application from BFC Dynamo was going to be negotiated in a meeting with the DFB presidium. The meeting with the DFB presidium on 18 March 2005 agreed that all titles won in East Germany, as well all others titles won in Germany since the first recognized championship in 1903, should qualify for stars.  However, the decision was subject to approval by the DFL. No final decision had yet been made by the DFB presidium.

However, BFC Dynamo took matters in its own hands and unilaterally emblazoned its shirts with three stars. The team displayed the three stars for first time in the match against FC Energie Cottbus II on 25 March 2005. The claim by BFC Dynamo was controversial because the club had been the favorite club of Erich Mielke and had a connection to the Stasi during the East German era. Critics in the DFB environment pointed to politically influenced championships in East Germany. BFC Dynamo had been sponsored by the Stasi and was given advantages. The club had privileged access to talents and a permanent training camp at Uckley in Königs Wusterhausen. However, also other clubs in East Germany had enjoyed similar advantages, which put the DFB in a difficult situation. Also former East German referee and CDU parliamentarian Bernd Heynemann spoke out for recognition of all East German titles.

The DFL rejected the application from the DFB and recommended the DFB to only honor clubs that were champions in the Bundesliga. However, the DFB chose to not follow the recommendation. The DFB presidium instead decided on a compromise solution on 19 July 2005 and adopted a new regulation for the 2005–06 season which gave all clubs the right to wear one single star for the championships they have won in the former East Germany and in Germany since 1903. Clubs were also allowed to indicate the number of championships they have won in the center of the star. The regulation only applies to clubs playing in a league under the DFB umbrella. It does not apply to clubs playing in the 2. Bundesliga and Bundesliga, which are organized by the DFL.

The new regulation meant that BFC Dynamo was finally allowed to emblazon its shirts with a championship star. The regulation also affected other former East German teams including Dynamo Dresden with its eight titles, 1. FC Frankfurt with its six titles and Magdeburg with its three titles in the Oberliga. BFC Dynamo has since then used the championship star in accordance with DFB graphic standards, displaying a star inscribed with the number ten for its ten East German titles.

Stadiums

The long-time home and training facility of BFC Dynamo is the Sportforum Hohenschönhausen in Alt-Hohenschönhausen in Berlin. The sports complex is the location of the club offices and the club house. It is also the base of the youth teams. More than 20 youth teams of BFC Dynamo regularly train at the facilities. The Sportforum Hohenschönhausen is considered the spiritual home of the club.

The Sportforum Hohenschönhausen was known as the Dynamo-Sportforum during the East German era. The sports complex was built as a training center for elite sport and was home to sports club SC Dynamo Berlin, with its many departments and squads. Development began in 1954 and expansion continued into the 1980s. The Sportforum is still unique as of today. The sports complex covers an area of 45 to 50 hectares and comprises 35 sports facilities as of 2020.

SC Dynamo Berlin played its first season at the large Walter-Ulbricht-Stadion in Mitte. The team moved its home matches to the football stadium in the Dynamo-Sportforum for the short transitional 1955 season. SC Dynamo Berlin returned to the Walter-Ulbricht-Stadion for the 1956 season. The team would play at the Walter-Ublricht-Stadion for the rest of the 1950s.

SC Dynamo Berlin eventually moved its home matches permanentely to the  Dynamo-Stadion im Sportforum after the after the construction of the Berlin wall began on 13 August 1961. The football stadium in the Dynamo-Sportforum held a capacity of 10,000 spectators at the beginning of the 1961–62 season. The team drew average attendances between 3,000 and 6,000 spectators in the DDR-Oberliga at the Dynamo-Stadion im Sportforum in the 1960s. The highlights were matches against local rival ASK Vorwärts Berlin and the various top teams during the period. The capacity of the football stadium in the Dynamo-Sportforum was gradually expanded during the 1960s.

BFC Dynamo began playing occasional matches that required floodlights at the larger Friedrich-Ludwig-Jahn-Sportpark in Prenzlauer Berg from November 1968. The Friedrich-Ludwig-Jahn-Sportpark was the home ground of FC Vorwärts Berlin at the time. However, the stadium became vacant when FC Vorwärts Berlin was relocated to Frankfurt an der Oder on 31 July 1971. BFC Dynamo played its home matches in the 1971-72 European Cup Winners' Cup at the Friedrich-Ludwig-Jahn-Sportpark. The matches against Åtvidabergs FF in the quarter-finals on 22 March 1972 and FC Dynamo Moscow in the semi-finals on 5 April 1972 were attended by 30,000 spectators. The team also played two home matches in the 1971-72 DDR-Oberliga at the Friedrich-Ludwig-Jahn-Sportpark.  However, more matches at the stadium was not possible after the summer of 1972, as the Friedrich-Ludwig-Jahn-Sportpark was then undergoing extensive renovation for the upcoming 10th World Festival of Youth and Students.

BFC Dynamo was qualified for the 1972-73 UEFA Cup. However, neither the Friedrich-Ludwig-Jahn-Sportpark nor the Walter-Ulbricht-Stadion were available for the upcoming UEFA Cup matches. Both were undergoing extensive renovation for the 10th World Festival of Youth and Students. Instead, the Dynamo-Stadion im Sportforum underwent a complete transformation in just five weeks between the end of July 1972 and September 1972. The capacity of the Dynamo-Stadion im Sportforum was now expanded to 20,000 spectators. BFC Dynamo played all home matches in the 1972-73 UEFA Cup at the Dynamo-Stadion im Sportforum. The attendance of 20,000 spectators during the match against Liverpool on 29 November 1972 is still a record attendance for the stadium. BFC Dynamo remained at the Dynamo-Stadion im Sportforum for a couple more seasons. The team saw rising attendance numbers at the Dynamo-Stadion im Sportforum during the 1970s. An average of 12,000 people attended the last six matches of BFC Dynamo at the Dynamo-Stadion im Sportforum in the second half of the 1973-74 season. The match between BFC Dynamo and 1. FC Magdeburg in the 1974-75 DDR-Oberliga at the Dynamo-Stadion im Sportforum on 8 March 1975 was attended by a whole 19,000 spectators.

BFC Dynamo eventually moved its home matches to the Friedrich-Ludwig-Jahn-Sportpark for the 1975-76 season, due to upcoming repair work at the Dynamo-Stadion im Sportforum. The move was meant to be temporary, but eventually became permanent. The Dynamo-Sportforum would primarily serve as a training facility from then and the football stadium would be used mostly by the reserve team BFC Dynamo II. The Friedrich-Ludwig-Jahn-Sportpark held a capacity of 30,00 spectators in the 1975-76 season. The average home attendance of 16,538 spectators for BFC Dynamo at the Friedrich-Ludwig-Jahn-Stadion in the 1975-76 DDR-Oberliga is the highest average league attendance in club history.  BFC Dynamo celebrated nine of its ten DDR-Oberliga titles in the Friedrich-Ludwig-Jahn-Stadium. The team also played most of its home matches in the UEFA competitions at the stadium. BFC Dynamo hosted teams such as Shakhtar Donetsk, Red Star Belgrade, Nottingham Forest, Hamburger SV, Aston Villa, AS Roma  FC Aberdeen at the Friedrich-Ludwig-Jahn-Stadium in the 1970s and 1980. However, all matches in the derby against 1. FC Union Berlin were played at the neutral Stadion der Weltjugend from the  1976–77 season for security reasons.

A permanent training camp for BFC Dynamo was built in Uckley in the Zernsdorf district of Königs Wusterhausen in Bezirk Potsdam at the end of the 1960s. It was located in the woods and completely sealed off from the surroundings. The training camp covered an area of around 10 hectares. The complex was equipped with a boarding school, several football pitches, a sports hall, a swimming pool, a fitness area and a sauna. The team would gather in Uckley days before its European matches. The players would have access to catering facilities, a nearby lake, a bowling alley, a cinema and pinball machines, among other things.

BFC Dynamo moved its home matches temporary to the Dynamo-Sportforum for the 1986-87 season, as the Friedrich-Ludwig-Jahn-Sportpark was undrgoing redevelopment during the season for the upcoming 750th anniversary of Berlin. The team also played its home matches in the 1986-87 European Cup at the Dynamo-Stadion im Sportforum. The team then returned to the Friedrich-Ludwig-Jahn-Sportpark for the 1987-88 season. The Friedrich-Ludwig-Jahn-Sportpark now had a new four storey grandstand and new floodlight masts. The current grandstand and the floodlights of the stadium dates from this time. The club was rebranded as FC Berlin after Die Wende. FC Berlin moved permanelty to the Stadion im Sportforum at the beginning of the 1992-93 season. The team would remain in the Sportforum Hohenschönhausen for many seasons to come.

The capacity of the Stadion im Sportforum was reduced to about 12,000 spectators in 1992. FC Berlin only drew an average of a couple of hundred spectators per match at the Stadion im Sportforum in the mid-1990s. The highlights were the matches against 1. FC Union Berlin. FC Berlin under Club President Volkmar Wanski announced plans in April 1998 to buy and modernize the stadium. However, the plans eventually failed due to lack of funds. The team saw rising attendance numbers at the Stadion im Sportforum at the end of the 1990s. Active supporters of BFC Dynamo were traditionally found at the northern curved end, popularly known as the Nordwall stand. 4,220 spectators watched the match between BFC Dynamo and Union Berlin at the Stadion im Sportforum on 23 November 1999.

Supporters of BFC Dynamo installed new bucket seats on the main stand and built a new clubhouse next to the main stand of the Stadion im Sportforum in 2002-2003. The Stadion im Sportforum was then equipped wih a 25-metre player tunnel and plexiglass-clad coaching benches in November 2004.  BFC Dynamo made new plans for a modern football stadium in the Sportforum Hohenschönhausen in 2006 under Club President Mario Weinkauf. The club now wanted to build a new modern stadium for 10,000–15,000 spectators. However, these plans did not materialize either. The Stadion im Sportforum was closed at the end of the 2005–06 season following the riots during the match between BFC Dynamo and Union Berlin on 13 May 2006. BFC Dynamo temporarily had to move to the Friedrich-Ludwg-Jahn-Sportpark. The stadium was then refurbished in 2006–2007 to increase safety and meet the requirements of the NOFV. The refurbishment included a new fence. 
  
BFC Dynamo won promotion to the Regionalliga Nordost at the end of the 2013-14 season. The team moved permanently to the Friedrich-Ludwig-Jahn-Sportpark for the 2014–15 season, due to increased media and spectator interest following its promotion. The 2014-15 Regionalliga Nordost meant matches against well-known opponents such as 1. FC Magdeburg and FC Carl Zeiss Jena. The more central location of the Friedrich-Ludwig-Jahn-Sportpark was seen by the club as an opportunity  to attract more spectators. The match between BFC Dynamo an 1. FC Magdeburg on 8 November 2014 was attended by 5,103 spectators. Active supporters of BFC Dynamo have traditionally been found on the main stand, and on the side opposite the main stand of the Friedrich Ludwig-Jahn-Sportpark. The match between BFC Dynamo and FC Schalke 04 in the first round of the 2018-19 DFB-Pokal at the Friedrich-Ludwig-Jahn-Sportpark on 17 August 2017 was watched by 14,117 spectators. The attendance was the highest attendance for BFC Dynamo since the fall of the Berlin wall. The average league attendance of BFC Dynamo in the 2017-18 Regionalliga Nordost would also be the highest average league attendance of BFC Dynamo since the 1990-91 season.

BFC Dynamo had to play a number of matches at the Stadion im Sportforum at the end of the 2018–19 season due to safety issues relating to the dilapidated floodlights at the Friedrich-Ludwig-Jahn-Sportpark. The move was greeted by some supporters as a move to the true home of the club. The club was then set to return to the Sportforum in the 2020–21 season as the Friedrich-Ludwig-Jahn-Sportpark was planned to be demolished for a complete redevelopment. The team was allowed to continue play in the Friedrich-Ludwig-Jahn-Sportpark until 31 December 2020. BFC Dynamo then officially announced on 21 March 2021 that the club was going to move back to the Sportforum Hohenschönhausen for the next season.

The Stadion im Sportforum was equipped with a floodlight system in April 2021. The club organized a work effort in the summer of 2021 to get the stadium in shape for the upcoming Regionalliga season.
 Supporters of BFC Dynamo gathered and cleared sections of the old stadium from weeds. Members of the interest group IG BFC'er also restored the iconic manual scoreboard above the curved end towards the Weißenseer Weg in time for the first home match of the 2021–22 season against Energie Cottbus on 28 July 2021. The attendance for BFC Dynamo at the Stadion im Sportforum in the 2021-22 Regionalliga Nordost was almost tripled compared to the last comparable league season before the COVID-19 pandemic. 3,219 people watched the match between BFC Dynamo and FC Carl Zeiss Jena on 10 April 2022.

Future stadium
The large stadium in the Friedrich-Ludwig-Jahn-Sportpark is planned to be demolished towards the end of 2023 for a complete redevelopment.  The new stadium im the Fredrich-Ludwig-Jahn-Sportpark is designed as an inclusive sports facility. The stadium will hold 20,000 spectators and meet the requirements for play in the 3. Liga and 2. Bundesliga. BFC Dynamo will be able to play matches at the new stadium. The new stadium in the Friedrich-Ludwig-Jahn-Sportpark is planned to be opened in 2028.

Supporters

East German era
BFC Dynamo played only a minor role in football in Berlin until the relocation of FC Vorwärts Berlin to Frankfurt an der Oder in 1971. The club initially had modest support, but with its growing successes in the 1970s, the club began to attract young fans, primarily from the central areas around the Friedrich-Ludwig-Jahn-Sportpark, such as Prenzlauer Berg and Mitte. Many came from working class families in Prenzlauer Berg. One of the first big supporter groups of BFC Dynamo was Black Eagle. The fan club was founded in 1972 and was one of the earliest fan clubs in East German football. Fans of BFC Dynamo were the first to sew their embroidered fan club badges on their jackets. This was a novelty among football supporters in East Germany in the 1970s.

The supporter scene became a focal point for various subcultures in the late 1970s and beginning of the 1980s. There were punks, rockers, hippies and a few early skinheads. Some were left-leaning and others were right-leaning. Football and stadium life offered free spaces that were difficult for the authorities to control. For some fans, being part of the supporter scene was an opportunity to rebel against the East German regime. Most supporters of BFC Dynamo had little to do with the state. It was more important for them to protest, do their own thing and break out from everyday life. Despite cheering for a club associated with the Stasi, supporters of BFC Dynamo were not loyal to the line. Many active fans in the 1980s were against the regime. Some supporters would even cut out the "D" for SV Dynamo on their club patches. "BFC" was considered free from the Stasi, while they thought the "D" symbolized the exact opposite.

Young people were gradually attracted by the provocative image of the club: its successes, its reputation as a Stasi club and the hatred of opposing fans. Some fans of BFC Dynamo found delight in the unpopularity of their club and took pride in the hatred they met. One fan recalled that the 1980s "were my greatest years, as we always had glorious success in provoking other fans" and another one that "we were really hated by everyone". Fans of BFC Dynamo would sometimes respond to the hatred they met by singing chants in praise of Erich Mielke as a provocation. They would also throw tropical fruits, that were only available in East Berlin, at home fans during away matches in Saxony.

BFC Dynamo came to be associated with areas such as Prenzlauer Berg, Pankow, Weißensee, Hohenschönhausen and certain cafés and restaurants in vicinity of Alexanderplatz. The supporter scene included groups such as Black Eagle, Norbert Trieloff, Bobbys, Iron Fist, Beatles BFC Club, Die Ratten, Berliner Wölfe, Heavy Horses, Black Pahnter and Madness boys of Preussen in the 1980s. Fashion played a big role in the BFC Dynamo supporter scene. Football supporters in East Berlin shared a sense of superiority over their counterparts in the regional districts. This was also the case with the supporters of Union Berlin, but notably with the supporters of BFC Dynamo. A saying among the supporters of BFC Dynamo was "We are few, but awesome!".

Football-related violence spread in East Germany in the 1970s. The supporter scene of BFC Dynamo was still young at the time, while clubs such Union Berlin and BSG Chemie Leipzig had large followings. A trip to Leipzig or Dresden was a difficult task. Supporters of BFC Dynamo responded to the hostile environment, and learned to compensate their smaller numbers, by being more aggressive and better organized. The dislike against BFC Dynamo in stadiums around the country and the hatred of opposing fans welded its supporters together. One fan of BFC Dynamo recalled: "It was really rumbling at away trips, and only then you felt your own strength. When we went with 200 people against 1,000 Unioners and you noticed: If you stick together, you have an incredible amount of violence." Supporters of BFC Dynamo would eventually gain a reputation for being particularly violent and organized. One fan of Union Berlin recalled: "There was hardly an enemy mob against us, we were just too many. But the people who stood in the way of the violence-seeking BFC:ers were very few. The BFC:ers were completely organized. These hundred and fifty people, everyone knew each other. They stood as a block like a wall." The book "Riot Boys!" by Jochen Schramm depicts the supporter scene of BFC Dynamo  and contains stories of violent away trips in the early 1980s. Jochen "Ellis" Schramm was a member of the hooligan scene of BFC Dynamo in the 1980s.

The development in the supporter scene of BFC Dynamo would eventually catch the attention of the authorities. The Stasi conducted a study on the violent structures of the supporter scene at the beginning of the 1980s. It found that 80 percent of those committing violent acts were 16–25 years old. Most of them were workers or students. It also found that 20 percent came from families of the socialist intelligentia. The Stasi assigned a group of two full-time officers from the district administration to the supporter scene during 1982–83 season. From then, supporters were accompanied, observed and documented. This was a measure that had previously also been applied to the supporter scene of Union Berlin. The authorities had allegedly been particularly alarmed when supporters of BFC Dynamo unfurled a poster in memory of Lutz Eigendorf with the text "Iron Foot, we mourn you!" during a match at the Friedrich-Ludwig-Jahn-Sportpark in April 1983. Supporters had also started a fan club in honour of Eigendorf. The Stasi would try to control the supporter scene with a broad catalogue of measures: persistent talks, intimidation attempts, reporting requirements and arrests. It would also attempt to infiltrate the fan clubs by unofficial collaborators (IM). All football fan clubs in East Germany had to undergo registration. According to Stasi information, BFC Dynamo had six registered fan clubs and 22 unauthorized fan clubs in 1986. Unauthorized fan clubs were those that were unregistered or did not meet DFV guidelines. East German state television would always try to hide riots from viewers. But the sound recording from football matches was the biggest problem. Additional sound systems were integrated into the stadium of BFC Dynamo for radio and telephone broadcasts. The system was also supposed to drown out shouts and chanting from the violent structures, so that television viewers and radio listeners would not hear anything.

The supporter scene of BFC Dynamo came to be increasingly associated with skinheads and far-right tendencies from the mid-1980s. More and more supporters of BFC Dynamo began to embrace skinhead fashion in the early 1980s. Skinhead fashion was now considered the most provocative outfit. The club had become one of the most popular football clubs in the growing skinhead movement by the mid-1980s. The reputation of BFC Dynamo as the hated Stasi club also attracted skinheads, who used the club as a stage for their provocations. Right-wing slogans and fascist chants were considered as the most challenging provocations, as anti-fascism was state doctrine and Nazism officially did not exist in East Germany. For young people, being a Nazi was sometimes considered the sharpest form of opposition. However, instances of Nazi provocations did not necessarily reflect genuine political convictions. At least some part of the "drift to the right" among East German youth during the 1980s was rooted in a desire to position oneself wherever the state was not. 
One fan of BFC Dynamo said: "None of us really knew anything about politics. But to raise your arm in front of the Volkspolizei was a real kick. You did that and for some of them, their whole world just fell apart".

The first East German hooligan group developed from the supporter scene of BFC Dynamo in the 1980s. The development was partly a response to the increasing state repression against the supporter scene, notably from the Stasi. An organized hooligan scene with groups, structures and training rooms, that was unique in East Germany, would eventually emerge at BFC Dynamo. The final of the 1987-88 FDGB-Pokal  between BFC Dynamo and Carl Zeiss Jena on 4 June 1988 saw some of the most serious violence ever witnessed at an East German football match. A group of 100 to 150 skinheads and other hooligans marched through Pankow to the Stadion der Weltjugend for the match. They chanted fascist slogans and clashed with other supporters. Riots then broke out in one of the blocks shortly before the end of the match. Supporters destroyed fences and threw seats at match stewards. A group of 300 supporters of BFC Dynamo had attempted to invade the pitch during the victory ceremony. They caused extensive damage to 60 seating benches. About a year later, supporters of BFC Dynamo would also destroy large parts of a block of the Friedrich-Ludwig-Jahn-Sportpark, during the match against AS Monaco in the 1989–90 European Cup Winners' Cup on 1 November 1989.

German reunification
A wave of violence swept through the football stadiums of East Germany in 1990. The collapse of the East German regime resulted in a security vacuum. The Volkspolizei was overwhelmed by the amount of disorder and often reluctant to use enough force, due to the political situation. Masked supporters of FC Berlin rioted in central Jena before the away match against FC Carl Zeiss Jena in the 1989-90 DDR-Oberliga on 8 April 1990. They broke shop windows, smashed windscreens of police vehicles with stones and left a trail of destruction in the city center. Supporters of FC Berlin also fired flares at police officers during the match. The disorder at the stadium would not cease and the match was eventually interrupted. The riots in Jena caught rare attention by East German state media, which until then had been generally silent about football related disorder.

Hooligans who had left East Germany for various reasons in recent years rejoined the hooligan scene after the opening of the Berlin Wall. Some were former skinheads who had been deported by the Stasi to West Germany in the late 1980s. Now they chanted things such as "Who should be our Führer? Erich Mielke!" as a provocative fun, to the dismay of the club. Supporters who returned from West Germany also brought back a new fashion based on designer clothing labels and expensive sportswear, which was adopted by the supporter scene. While combat boots and bomber jackets were now common at many places in East Germany, some supporters of BFC Dynamo wanted to differentiate themselves. Expensive sneakers was now the new fashion in the supporter scene. Brands such as Diesel, Iceberg, Chevignon, Adidas, Best Company, New Balance and Ray Ban became popular.

Hooligans of FC Berlin stormed the home end of the Stadion an der Alten Försterei armed with clubs and flares and hunted down supporters of Union Berlin during the match between Union Berlin and FC Berlin in the second round of the 1990-91 FDGB-Pokal on 23 September 1990. Serious riots broke out in the city after the match, involving hundreds of supporters. Street battles broke out in areas of East Berlin, even spreading to Kreuzberg in West Berlin. One supporter of FC Berlin said: "In 1990, thanks to the many departures to the West, it became clear relatively quickly that there was no flowerpot to be won with the current team. We then turned our attention to other things."  Hooligans in East Germany unleashed almost unbridled violence against the representatives of the disintegrating East German state. Violent riots had occurred in Rostock, Dresden, Erfurt and East Berlin. Police had been forced to shoot warning shots during violent riots in Leipzig and one match in the 1990-91 NOFV-Oberliga had already been abandoned due to riots in the stadium.

The situation peaked during a match between FC Sachsen Leipzig and FC Berlin on 3 November 1990. Supporters of FC Berlin travelled in large numbers to Leipzig for the match. The police had only 219 officers available for the match. There were clashes at the Leipzig main railway station, with one police officer injured and 50 supporters taken into custody. A first group of around 100 supporters of FC Berlin entered the Georg-Schwarz-Sportpark in time for kick-off. They had been joined by hooligans of 1. FC Lokomotive Leipzig, who had forced their way into the stadium. Supporters of both camps tried to attack each other in the stadium and the police had difficulties in maintaining a buffer zone. A second group of around 400 supporters of FC Berlin arrived later at the nearby Leipzig-Leutzsch S-Bahn station at Am Ritterschlößchen street. Fireworks were fired as they made their way to the stadium. The group was blocked from entering the stadium by police equipped with helmets and shields, despite showing valid tickets. The supporters  were not given any reason. They were then pushed back by the police using tear gas and truncheons. The group returned to the S-Bahn station and made an attempt to reach the stadium from the Pettenkofer Straße instead. They were again blocked by police who immediately used truncheons.

Riots broke out at the S-Bahn station. The station building was vandalized and numerous cars were smashed or burned, including at least one W 50 police truck and one police car. The police was allegedly outnumbered. However, the high number of supporters of FC Berlin at the scene claimed by the police has been disputed.  Cobblestones were thrown at the police waiting at the Pettenkofer Straße. The police now decided to use their firearms. 18-year old supporter Mike Polley (de) from the locality of Malchow in Berlin was hit by several bullets and instantly killed. He was allegedly about to bend down to a friend when hit. Several others were injured and at least another three people were seriously injured. One supporter of FC Berlin was hit in the head and suffered critical injuries, but survived. The police had fired between 50 and 100 shots in about a minute, from 11 different police pistols. Reports and sources vary on what happened on the scene and how the situation was. The police claim that they were surrounded. But this was rebuffed by an eyewitness. Shots had been fired from distances as long as 30–40 meters. The police had also fired at fleeing supporters. One supporter was hit while trying to escape into an S-Bahn train. Not every injured had come with the supporters of FC Berlin. Also an uninvolved woman was shot in the leg.

After the shootings, some supporters of FC Berlin left the S-Bahn station by train. Many were shaken, but other wanted to take revenge. A group of supporters stopped a tram, kicked the driver out and maneuvered it down town. Riots now continued in central Leipzig, where policed presence was low. The riots in central Leipzig continued for several hours and the damage was extensive. Supporters of FC Berlin devastated entire streets. All shop windows on the Nikolaistraße opposite the main railway station were broken. There was rampage at the Park Hotel. The ground floor of a department store on Brühl was destroyed. Numerous cars were demolished and up to 31 shops were smashed and looted. Supporters clashed with transport police at the main railway station. New shots were fired by the police, but no one was injured.

 Mike Polley was considered a beginner in the supporter scene. A demonstration against police violence with 1,000 participants was arranged in Prenzlauer Berg by supporters of FC Berlin after the match against HFC Chemie on 10 November 1990. The demonstration was supported by the recently founded Fanprojekt Berlin. Also professional FC Berlin players such as Waldemar Ksienzyk participated in the march. The demonstration  received support from politicians such as Lena Schraut from the Alternative List and from left-wing activists, notably from the occupied houses near Senefelderplatz at the Schönhauser Allee. The friendly match between East Germany and West Germany that was planned to be held on the Zentralstadion in Leipzig on 21 November 1990 was cancelled for security reasons and due to the tense situation among football supporters after the shootings. An investigation against ten police officers was opened, but closed in April 1992. The exact circumstances around the death of Mike Polley were never fully clarified.

Stadium attendance collapsed in 1990. Many supporters stopped attending matches after the Peaceful revolution, as the best players were sold off to clubs in West Germany, sports performance slumped, tickets prices rose, mass unemployment spread and hooligans had come to dominate the stands. Some shifted their focus to ice hockey instead. The average league attendance of the 1990–91 NOFV-Oberliga was by far the lowest in the league history. BFC Dynamo was hit particularly hard by the decline. Average league attendance at BFC Dynamo had dropped from 8,385 in the 1988–89 season to 1,076 in the 1990–91 season. Ordinary supporters had disappeared. Only young supporters remained in the stadium at FC Berlin in 1990 and 1991.

The violent faction of FC Berlin would come to shape the entire 1990–91 season. Matches involving FC Berlin were all security matches. A group of 500–600 supporters of FC Berlin travelled with a special train to Rostock for an away match against F.C. Hansa Rostock on 16 March 1991. The police did not manage to control the situation despite a record strong presence of more than 600 officers. Riots broke out in central Rostock, where supporters smashed shops, demolished cars and attacked people. Supporters without tickets stormed the Ostseestadion and there were fights with supporters of F.C. Hansa Rostock around the stadium. Riots at the train station after the match had to be suppressed by the police with tear gas and water cannons. The damage was again extensive. Up to 17 shops at the Wismarischen Straße were smashed and looted, the train station was devastated and the special train was vandalized. Two police officers were injured in the turmoil.

Hooliganism
The hooligan scene of FC Berlin at the beginning of the 1990s was considered the most notorious for years in Germany. Hooligans of FC Berlin were subsequently involved in many fights in stadiums, woods and meadows. The youth television programme Elf99 on Deutscher Fernsehfunk (DFF) ran a special story on the hooligans of FC Berlin in August 1991. The story was called "Elf-Spezial: Das randalierende Rätsel – Der Berliner Hooligans zwischen Wahn und Scham?" and can be found on YouTube as of 2020. Hooligans of FC Berlin attacked an asylum shelter in Greifswald in connection to an away match against Greifswalder SC 1926 in the 1991-92 NOFV-Oberliga Nord on 3 November 1991. SV Hafen Rostock 61 subsequently postponed its upcoming league match at home against FC Berlin for security reasons.

Playing for meager crowds in regional leagues, the club eventually became a meeting place for individuals from the Berlin far-right, hooligan and criminal underground. The hooligan scene of FC Berlin developed a connection to the eastern Berlin bouncer scene in the mid-1990s. The eastern Berlin bouncer scene would eventually be almost completely organized from the hooligan scene of BFC Dynamo. One of those involved in the assault on French policeman Daniel Nivel during the 1998 FIFA World Cup had connections to the hooligan scene of FC Berlin. The same man was later linked to organized crime and eventfully involved in a high-profile drug trafficking case.

The match between BFC Dynamo and Berlin Türkspor 1965 in the final of the 1998–99 Berlin Cup on 11 May 1999 was marked by violence. Supporters of BFC Dynamo directed far-right chants and others provocations against Berlin Türkspor 1965 during the match. 400 supporters of BFC Dynamo invaded the pitch after the final whistle to celebrate the title. Some supporters also attacked players of Berlin Türkspor 1965. Two players of Berlin Türkspor 1965 were injured, one of them had suffered a stab wound. BFC Dynamo Club President Volkmar Wanski was able to prevent a total escalation by giving a calming speech over the stadium microphone. He immediately apologized for the behavior of the supporters at the press conference after the match. Older supporters of BFC Dynamo openly expressed their contempt for the far-right supporters that had visited the match. BFC Dynamo and Berlin Türkspor 1965 agreed to meet in a friendly match later in the season and to organize a joint meal for players and responsible. Wanski made it clear in the speakers ahead of the last home match against FC Rot-Weiß Erfurt in the 1998-99 Regionalliga Nordost on 15 May 1999 that "anyone who cannot behave has no business in our stadium".

Serious riots broke out in Prenzlauer Berg after the match between BFC Dynamo and 1. FC Union Berlin in the Round of 16 of the 2000–01 Berlin Cup at the Friedrich-Ludwig-Jahn-Sportpark on 24 March 2001. Around 150 supporters of BFC Dynamo attacked the police after the match, as they wanted to storm the block of Union Berlin. Arund 500 supporters of BFC Dynamo then attacked police at Eberswalder Straße. The police employed water cannons against supporters at Eberswalder Straße and Schönhauser Allee. Nine people, including four police officers, were injured. BFC Dynamo Club President Karin Halsch (de) and 1. FC Union Berlin Club President Heiner Bertram criticized the police in unison for provocations during the match and for triggering riots. Karin Halsch simultaneously expressed sadness that the riots destroyed a lot of reconstruction work in the club and announced that there would be many stadium bans. Also coach Jürgen Bogs spoke out about "senseless violence" that would once again fall back on the club, but also criticized the police for provocations. Many of those involved in the riots did not come from the supporter scene of BFC Dynamo. Many were visitors from other cities in Germany.

BFC Dynamo had the highest number of violent supporters in Germany in 2005. Violence broke out during the match between Tennis Borussia Berlin and BFC Dynamo in the 2004-05 NOFV-Oberliga Nord at the Mommsenstadion on 11 February 2005. A flare was lit and a couple of bangers set off in the guest block at the beginning of the second half. Police then decided to intervene against away supporters. Police officers were pelted with beer cups and attacked by supporters of BFC Dynamo when they entered gest block. Eight police officers were injured and 11 supporters of BFC Dynamo arrested. BFC Dynamo criticized the police operation as "disproportionate". Supporters of BFC Dynamo claimed that they had been called  "Nazis", "Ossis" and "Unioners" by police officers. Riots had broken out also when Tennis Borussia Berlin played 1. FC Union Berlin in round of 16 of the 2004-05 Berlin Cup at the Mommsenstadion a couple of weeks before.

Fighting between supporters of BFC Dynamo and police again broke out in connection with the match between BFC Dynamo and SV Yeşilyurt at the Friedrich-Ludwig-Jahn-Sportpark on 24 April 2005. The mood had been tense during the match. The situation escalated when celebrating supporters of BFC Dynamo attacked the fence after the final whistle. Police intervened with water hoses, batons and tear gas against supporters of BFC Dynamo. Four police officers were injured and five hooligans arrested. One police officer suffered a broken nose and another one a concussion. Riots again broke out in connection to a match between BFC Dynamo and SV Yeşilyurt at the opening of the 2005-06 NOFV-Oberliga Nord at the Friedrich-Ludwig-Jahn-Sportpark 5 August 2005. The match was attended by 1,200 supporters of BFC Dynamo. Hooligans in the crowd threw bottles and stones at police officers during the match. Fights between hooligans and police then broke out after match. Around 150 hooligans had participated in the riots, according to police information. BFC Dynamo spokesperson Yiannis Kaufmann claimed that those involved were a "mob of travelling fans who wants to cause trouble everywhere and now discredit the BFC". As many as 13 police officers were injured in the riots.

Police made a controversial raid against the discotheque Jeton in Friedrichshain where supporters of BFC Dynamo and other people had gathered to celebrate in connection to a fan tournament in memory of Mike Polley on the night of 20 August 2005. The fan tournament had been visited by numerous teams, including teams from FC St. Pauli, 1. FC Lokomotive Leipzig, Aberdeen F.C., VfL Bochum and Malmö FF. The large-scale police operation involved 300 officers, including 100 members of the SEK. 158 persons were arrested. Among the detainees were 19 Category C-supporters and 22 Category B-supporters. Supporters filed numerous complaints against the police for use of excessive violence. 39 people at the discotheque were injured. Also bystanders were affected. Police initially claimed they had been pelted with bottles and furnishings, but later corrected their statement and admitted that there had been no resistance. The police had allegedly beaten defenseless people. Police stated that the raid was a preventative measure on short notice to prevent hooligans from organizing for the upcoming match against Union Berlin on 21 August 2005. There were speculations that police also took revenge for riots during the match between BFC Dynamo and SV Yeşilyurt at the opening of the season. More than 1,000 police officers were deployed to the derby and the match was played without crowd trouble. Banners in solidarity with the supporters of BFC Dynamo were displayed in 17 football stadiums across Germany during the following matchdays.

The return match between BFC Dynamo and Union Berlin in the 2005–06 NOFV-Oberliga Nord was played at the Stadion im Sportforum on 13 May 2006. The standing was 1–1 when supporters of BFC Dynamo invaded the pitch in an attempt to storm the block of Union Berlin around the 75th minute. Supporters of Union Berlin fled in panic. The match was abandoned and Union Berlin was awarded a 2–0 win. The players of BFC Dynamo wore the motto "No power of violence" on their shirts in the following match against BFC Preussen away on 17 May 2006. The Stadion im Sportforum was temporarily closed for matches in the NOFV-Oberliga Nord after the riots. The riots during the match against 1. FC Union Berlin threw the club into a financial crisis. Treasurer Sven Radicke concluded: "Four years of our work were ruined in five minutes".

BFC Dynamo has often attracted hooligans from outside, and hooligans who are otherwise not involved in the supporter scene, to high-profile matches. The club has repeatedly complained about so-called "riot tourists". Riots broke out after the match against Berliner AK 07 in the final of the 2009–10 Berlin Cup at the Friedrich-Ludwig-Jahn-Sportpark on 2 June 2010. Around 100–150 supporters of BFC Dynamo attempted to invade the pitch after the final whistle. Match stewards and players of BFC Dynamo threw themselves in to restrain supporters and prevent further riots. Goalkeeper Nico Thomaschewski later received an award from the Berlin Football Association (BFV) for his actions. Polish fans of Pogoń Szczecin were allegedly linked to the riots. Those who had invaded the pitch were whistled by other supporters of BFC Dynamo when they returned to the stands.

Major riots then occurred after the match against 1. FC Kaiserslautern in the first round of the 2011-12 DFB-Pokal  at the Friedrich-Ludwig-Jahn-Sportpark on 3 July 2011. Around 200–300 supporters of BFC Dynamo invaded the buffer zone and stormed the guest block  after the match. 18 police officers and many supporters from Kaiserslautern were injured in the attack. The Chairman of the Economic Council Peter Meyer openly expressed his embarrassment and disappointment over the behavior of some supporters and publicly apologized. There were allegations that hooligans outside the BFC Dynamo environment had been involved. While the police stated that most of those arrested were from Berlin, the club claimed it had never seen most of the recent perpetrators before.

The contemporary supporter scene
The contemporary supporter scene contains various subcultures and categories of supporters. It ranges from older supporters to younger ultras. Older supporters constitute an essential part of the supporter scene. Many are active in the supporter group 79er. The group is credited for its commitment to the club, notably the youth teams. Its members have been supporters of BFC Dynamo since the late 1970s.

The supporter scene played an important part in saving the club from bankruptcy in 2001. Supporters organized a demonstration against the impending bankruptcy. The demonstration marched from the Sportforum to the Rotes Rathaus where it was met by the former club president and SPD politician Karin Halsch. Supporters threw parties and organized collections, made donations and travelled to countries such as Austria and Switzerland to convince creditors to accept smaller pay-offs in order to save the cub. Supporters also installed bucket seats at the Stadion im Sportforum and built a new clubhouse in the Sportforum during the insolvency. The insolvency crisis remains a defining moment for older supporters. The supporter scene has traditionally arranged an annual Mike-Polley-Gedenkturnier, which is a football fan tournament in memory of Mike Polley. The first edition of the fan tournament was arranged in the Sportforum Hohenschönhausen in 2003 and comprised 28 teams. A march in memory of Mike Polley in Leipzig in 2018 was attended by 850 supporters of BFC Dynamo.

New groups of younger ultra-oriented supporters have emerged since the 2000s.
Supporter group Fraktion H was founded in 2006 by younger supporters who wanted to create more atmosphere in the stadium. A minor ultras scene then emerged with the founding of supporter group Ultras BFC in 2011. The ultras of BFC Dynamo have initiated campaigns such as "Brown is not Claret" and have also engaged in football tournaments for refugees. The club has encouraged the new groups of younger supporters and club management has taken a stand against racism and right-wing extremism. Fraktion H maintains a friendship with the supporters of Eintracht Trier, while members of  the now dissolved Ultras BFC have had contacts with the ultras of Swedish football club GAIS.

BFC Dynamo is affiliated with Fanprojekt Berlin, which is an independent organization that engages in socio-pedagogical fan work. The organization supports young fans in various aspects of life and aims at promoting a positive supporter culture. BFC Dynamo engages in active fan work and has taken measures to control violent elements, to exclude known violators and to distance itself from radical supporters. Far-right symbols and slogans are not tolerated by the club. The Chairman of the Economic Council, Peter Meyer, stated in connection with a friendly match against Hertha BSC in 2007 that the club did not want people who cannot follow the rules and that "anyone who shouts Nazi slogans will be thrown out of the stadium". A large number of stadium bans has been issued by the club since the mid-2000s. A total of 40 stadium bans was issued only in 2006. No riots has occurred since 2011.

The contemporary supporter scene includes groups such as 79er, Mythos BFC, Fraktion H, Piefkes, Ultras BFC, East Company, Riot Sport, Black Boys Dynamo, Bärenbande, Gegengerade, Hipstercrew, Märkische Jungs and Sektion Süddeutschland. Supporter group Gegengerade is a left wing-oriented fan club. Supporters of BFC Dynamo have occasionaly displayed a Norwegian flag with the text "Thanks Norway", in memory of Norway's 2-0 win over Nazi Germany in the quarter-finals of the 1936 Summer Olympics. Another banner that has occasionally been displayed at the stadium contains the text "There Is A Light That Never Goes Out", with reference to the 1980s British cult band The Smiths. Ultras BFC announced its dissolution on 23 January 2023, after the group had lost essential material in an attack. An individual in the group was attacked by a group of people in front of his private residence and robbed of essential group material. The group apologized to the supporter scene of BFC Dynamo and consequently  dissolved, but at the same time announced that this was not the end.

BFC Dynamo had 100 Category C and 190 Category-B supporters in 2019. Younger hooligans of BFC Dynamo have contacts with supporter group Kaliber 030 at Hertha. 20–25 supporters of BFC Dynamo joined Hertha in the guest block of the Stadion an der Alten Försterei during the derby between Union Berlin and Hertha on 2 November 2019. Older hooligans of BFC Dynamo, on the other hand, maintain friendly relationships with parts of the supporter scene of 1. FC Magdeburg.  Supporters of BFC Dynamo attempted to travel in numbers to the return leg against VfB Oldenburg in the promotion play-offs for the 3. Liga on 4 June 2022. Up to 2,500 supporters of BFC Dynamo wanted to join the team in Oldenburg. Around 1,300 supporters of BFC Dynamo was eventually admitted to the Marschweg-Stadion, where they marked their presence with a banner, a scarf choreography and flares.

One of the most well-known books in Germany about the supporter scene of BFC Dynamo is "Der BFC war schuld am Mauerbau" by German author Andreas Gläser (de). The book was first published in 2002 and describes the supporter scene from the late 1970s and forward. The club, its reputation and supporter scene, was also the theme of stage play "Dynamoland" by Gudrun Herrbold. The play was set up in 2007 and involved young football players from BFC Dynamo as well as Andreas Gläser. The fanzine "Zugriff" is dedicated to BFC Dynamo. The fanzine is produced by Andreas Gläser and members of supporter group Gegengerade since 2008. The tenth and latest issue was published in 2014. The tenth issue came with as music CD mixed by Andreas Gläser. The CD included numerous ska and punk tracks as well as a 25 seconds long recording of Erich Mielke ranting about skinheads and punks.

Musicians from German rock band Klaus Renft Combo composed the anthem "Auf, Dynamo!" for BFC Dynamo in 1999. German rap musician Joe Rilla has also dedicated a song to BFC Dynamo. The song is called "Heb die Faust Hoch (BFC Dynamo Straßenhymne)" and was released in 2008. Joe Rilla, whose real name is Hagen Stoll (de), has a background in the hooligan scene of BFC Dynamo. The clothing store Hoolywood on Schönhauser Allee in Prenzlauer Berg is associated with the supporter scene of BFC Dynamo. The store was founded at the beginning of the 1990s. The store has been an advertising partner of BFC Dynamo.

Rivalries

SG Dynamo Dresden
The oldest rival of BFC Dynamo is SG Dynamo Dresden. The rivalry dates back to 1954 when the team of Dynamo Dresden and its place in the DDR-Oberliga was transferred to SC Dynamo Berlin during the course of the 1954-55 season. The relocation aroused a sense of victimhood among the fans of Dynamo Dresden which would later be compounded by the successes of BFC Dynamo. Matters were exacerbated when additional players of Dynamo Dresden were delegated to Dynamo Berlin by the German Football Association of the GDR (DFV) following the relegation of Dynamo Dresden after the 1962–63 season.

The antagonism between the two clubs was underpinned by a historical German rivalry between Prussian Berlin and Saxony. It was fueled by contemporary resentment in Dresden at the better provision of housing and consumer goods in the East German capital. East Berliners were generally unpopular outside the city limits, especially in the southern regional districts of East Germany. They were considered arrogant and clearly preferred.

Dynamo Dresden slowly recovered from the relocation. The club was declared a regional district center of excellence by the regional district board of the DTSB on 5 August 1968. The club could now draw on the best players in Bezirk Dresden. Dynamo Dresden eventually re-established itself in the DDR-Oberliga and became campions once again in the 1970-71 DDR-Oberliga. BFC Dynamo and Dynamo Dresden then met in the final of the 1970-71 FDGB-Pokal. Klaus Sammer scored 1-0 for Dynamo Dresden, but Norbert Johannsen equalized on a penalty. Dynamo Dresden eventually won the match 2-1 after a second goal by Sammer in extra time. Dynamo Dresden thus secured the first Double in the history of East German football. However, BFC Dynamo did not go completely empty-handed from the final. The team qualified for its first UEFA competition as runners-up. Its participation in the 1971–72 European Cup Winners' Cup would be a success. 
 
Dynamo Dresden would come to dominate East German fotball in the 1970s. The team managed to capture a third consecutive league title in the 1977–78 DDR-Oberliga. What happened after is subject to various rumors. Formal title celebrations took place in June 1978 at the hotel and restaurant Bastein at Prager Straße in Dresden. Erich Mielke paid a visit as the president of SV Dynamo to congratulate the team to the title. Dynamo Dresden player Reinhard Häfner recalls how Mielke held a speech where he said that he would be happier if BFC Dynamo was champions. Mielke should have added that "since BFC Dynamo is also SV Dynamo, the title stays in the family, so to speak, and that is good too". According to other versions of the same event, he allegedly proclaimed that everything will be done so that in the coming year, the champion will come from Berlin, and that it was now the turn of the BFC Dynamo.

 BFC Dynamo stood out among other clubs within SV Dynamo. The club was located at the frontline of the Cold War. It was also a representative of the capital of East Germany. This meant that the club had to be well equipped. BFC Dynamo would come to benefit from a nationwide scouting system, supported by numerous training centers (TZ) of SV Dynamo across East Germany. The team embarked on a period of unparalleled success in the 1978–79 season under young coach Jürgen Bogs. Dynamo Dresden had been the dominant team in East German football until then. BFC Dynamo would now be its main obstacle to success.

BFC Dynamo opened the 1978-79 DDR-Oberliga with ten consecutive wins. The team thus broke the previous record of Dynamo Dresden of seven consecutive wins from the 1972-73 DDR-Oberliga. Dynamo Dresden, on the other hand, had a moderately successful start to the season and stood in second place. The two teams met in the 11th matchday in front of 33,000 spectators at Dynamo-Stadion in Dresden on 2 December 1978. The match ended in a draw 1-1 after an equalizer by Hans-Jürgen Riediger for BFC Dynamo. The match was marked by crowd trouble, with 38 fans to both teams arrested. 17 of the 38 fans arrested were fans of BFC Dynamo. Inexperienced linesman Günter Supp should allegedly have missed an offside position on Riediger in the situation leading up to the equalizer. There were accusations in Dresden that the match had been manipulated by the referees in favor of BFC Dynamo. This alleged manipulation was cited as yet another example of discrimination against the Saxon city in comparison with East Berlin. BFC Dynamo continued to lead the league for the rest of the season. The team finally secured its first DDR-Oberliga title after defeating Dynamo Dresden 3–1 in the 24th match day in front of 22,000 spectators at Friedrich-Ludwig-Jahn-Sportpark on 6 June 1979.

The 1979-80 DDR-Oberliga would be tight race between the two rivals. Dynamo Dresden led the league for most of the season. Dynamo Dresden was still in first place before the last matchday. However, BFC Dynamo was only one point behind. The two rivals met at the Friedrich-Ludwig-Jahn-Sportpark in the last matchday of the league season on 10 May 1980. Dynamo Dresden only needed a draw to win the league title. There was huge excitement around the match and the stadium was sold out. East German fotboll weekly Die neue Fußballwoche (FuWo) reported on "international match atmosphere". The standing was 0-0 for a long time. Dynamo Dresden player Peter Kotte fell in the BFC Dynamo penalty area with about 15 minutes left of regular time, but Dynamo Dresden was denied a penalty. Norbert Trieloff instead scored a goal for BFC Dynamo just a moment later. BFC Dynamo eventually won the match 1-0 and captured its second consecutive league title in front of 30,000 spectators. Dynamo Dresden would not come this close to BFC Dynamo in the league until the end of the 1980s. It was rumoured that referee Hans Kulicke from Oderberg had favored BFC Dynamo. However, also BFC Dynamo had been denied a chance to decide the match. A goal by Hartmut Pelka had been disallowed by referee Kulicke due to a foul on Dynamo Dresden goalkeeper Bernd Jakubowski.

Both clubs were affiliated to SV Dynamo and supported by the security organs. However, BFC Dynamo was more associated with the Stasi, while Dynamo Dresden was more associated with the Volkspolizei. BFC Dynamo was known as the favourite club of the head of the Stasi Erich Mielke. Dynamo Dresden, on the other hand, was patronaged by Volkspolizei Lieutenant general Willi Nyffenegger. Nyffenegger was the long-time head of the regional district authority of the Volkspolizei in Bezirk Dresden. However, also Dynamo Dresden had supporters in the Stasi. The Stasi had helped Dynamo Dresden to obtain secret information about the line-up of FC Bayern Munich before the match between Dynamo Dresden and FC Bayern Munich in the 1973–74 European Cup on 7 November 1973. Dynamo Dresden would also be supported by Stasi Major general Horst Böhm in the 1980s. Böhm was the head of the regional district administration of the Stasi in Bezirk Dresden. He was a committed local patriot when it came to Dynamo Dresden and a sponsoring member of the club. The antagonism between the two clubs also spread to the Stasi Guards Regiment "Felix E. Dzerzhinsky". The behavior of members of a Dresden unit during a match between the two teams in 1985 was likened to that of "rioting fans" by another Stasi officer. Some Stasi guards had hurled abuse at BFC Dynamo players, shouting "Bent champions!" as they left the pitch.

Resentment in Dresden over the rise of BFC Dynamo was worsened when three top players of Dynamo Dresden, Gerd Weber, Peter Kotte and Matthias Müller, were arrested on suspicion of planning to defect to West Germany in 1981. Weber had solicited plans to defect, but the other two had not. Weber received a prison sentence and a lifetime ban from playing football at any level in East Germany, while Kotte and Müller received lifetime bans from playing in the top two tiers for alleged complicity. Neither would return to the Oberliga. The punishment against the three players led to rumors and protests in Dresden. They also fueled local patriotism and anti-Berlin sentiments in Dresden.

Fans of Dynamo Dresden saw the lifetime bans on Weber, Kotte and Müller as "an order from Erich Mielke" designed to weaken Dynamo Dresden. Also, Kotte has claimed they were part of a delibate plan by Mielke to weaken Dynamo Dresden. However, such claims are doubtful. The three players had been reported by an unofficial collaborator (IM) and Mielke was convinced that all three were originally prepared to defect. Kotte was not an isolated case. The great fear of footballers, fans and officials who had fled East Germany was omnipresent at the Stasi. Kotte and Müller knew about the intentions of Weber. Their failure to inform authorities was critical. Former SED First Secretary in Bezik Dresden Hans Modrow concludes that the measures against the three were "generally cautious", given the completely different consequences for other East German citizens in similar contexts. After all, the three were also members of the armed organs with ranks. Müller said in an interview with Dresdner Neueste Nachrichten in 2011 that he "knew one hundred percent" that the uncompromising actions against the three players were a deliberate attempt by the Stasi to weaken Dynamo Dresden in order to secure the supremacy of BFC Dynamo.

BFC Dynamo and Dynamo Dresden would be the two main contenders for titles in East German football during the 1980s. BFC Dynamo dominated the DDR-Oberliga and won consecutive titles, while Dynamo Dresden had major success in the FDGB-Pokal. The two teams met in the 1981-82 FDGB-Pokal and 1983-84 FDGB-Pokal final. Dynamo Dresden won both finals and thus stopped BFC Dynamo from completing the Double. The teams then also met in the 1984-85 FDGB-Pokal final. The performance of the referees in the final was controversial. A review by the DFV found that 30 percent of the referee decisions during the match had been wrong, and that 80 percent of those had been of disadvantage to Dynamo Dresden. Referee Manfred Roßner was banned one year from officiating matches above second tier after the final. However, nothing emerged that indicated that Roßner had been bought by the Stasi. Dynamo Dresden won the final 3–2 in front of 48,000 spectators at the Stadion der Weltjugend. It was BFC Dynamo's fourth loss against Dynamo Dresden in the final of the FDGB-Pokal and the third time that Dynamo Dresden had stopped the team from completing the Double. BFC Dynamo would ultimately manage to complete the Double in the 1987–88 season, defeating FC Carl Zeiss Jena 2–0 in final of the 1987–88 FDGB-Pokal.

Disturbances by spectators was a regular occurrence at matches between the two teams. BFC Dynamo was met by immense hostility during away matches in Dresden. Fans of BFC Dynamo would  respond to the hatred they met by singing chants in praise of Erich Mielke as a provocation. Fans of BFC Dynamo also made fun of the food shortage in Dresden. They occasionally brought coveted tropical fruits, that were only available in East Berlin, to away matches in Saxony. The fruits were then thrown at the home crowd. In Dresden they threw green bananas at the home fans and shouted: "We brought you something - Bananas, bananas!". A number of fans of Dynamo Dresden were arrested after the match between the two teams in the 1987-88 DDR-Oberliga in East Berlin on 6 April 1988 for shouting anti-Semitic slogans against BFC Dynamo, such as "Berlin Jews!" and "Jews' sow!" East German state television would always try to hide riots from viewers. Sound engineers also had to drown out chants that were considered negative, such as "Stasi out". The match between BFC dynamo and SG Dynamo Dresden was the most explosive encounter. At one point, the match between BFC Dynamo and SG Dynamo Dresden was even ordered to be recorded completely without sound.

BFC Dynamo's ten-year dominance in the league was eventually broken by Dynamo Dresden in the 1988–89 season. BFC Dynamo won a second consecutive cup title in the 1988-89 FDGB-Pokal, but Dynamo Dresden became the new champion in the 1988-89 DDR-Oberliga. BFC Dynamo and Dynamo Dresden then met in the first ever DFV-Supercup in 1989. BFC Dynamo won the match 4–1 in front of 22,347 spectators at the Stadion der Freundschaft in Cottbus and became the first and only winner of the DFV-Supercup in the history of East German football.

BFC Dynamo and Dynamo Dresden met 60 times in the Oberliga, FDGB-Pokal and DFV-Supercup between 1966 and 1991. BFC Dynamo won 21 matches and Dynamo Dresden won 27 matches. BFC Dynamo and Dynamo Dresden also met 10 times in the Regionalliga Nordost between 1995 and 2000. BFC Dynamo won 3 matches and Dynamo Dresden won 5 matches. The last meeting ended 1–1 and took place in the 1999-00 Regionalliga Nordost on 26 April 2000. The two teams rarely meet these days, because Dynamo Dresden regularly appears in the second or third tier of the German football league system. Former Dynamo Dresden player Ralf Minge expressed in an interview in 2018 his satisfaction that Dynamo Dresden has advanced past BFC Dynamo, but also said that he would not mind new duels with BFC Dynamo and that duels with BFC Dynamo "have a certain charm".

1. FC Union Berlin

BFC Dynamo and 1. FC Union Berlin were founded only a few days apart. Both clubs were formed during the reorganization of East German football in December 1965 and January 1966, when the football departments of ten sports clubs (SC) were reorganized into dedicated football clubs. However, Union Berlin was not part of the original plan. Two football clubs had already been planned for East Berlin. They were to be formed from the football departments of SC Dynamo Berlin and ASK Vorwärts Berlin. In addition, TSC Berlin played only in the second tier DDR-Liga at the time. The founding of Union Berlin probably owed much to the intervention of the powerful Herbert Warnke. Herbert Warnke was the chairman of the national state trade union FDGB and a member of the SED Politburo.  Dynamo Berlin and Vorwärts Berlin were both associated with the armed and security organs. Herbert Warnke therefore argued for the formation of a civilian club for the working people of East Berlin. He would be a passionate fan of Union Berlin. Another high-ranking SED politician who also pushed for the founding a civilian football club in East Berlin was the SED First Secretary in East Berlin and SED Politburo member Paul Verner. Verner held a speech at the founding ceremony of Union Berlin.

Both BFC Dynamo and Union Berlin belonged to the elite in East German football. The new football clubs were intended as centers of excellence, with the right to draw on talents within designated geographical areas. BFC Dynamo was supported by the Stasi, while Union Berlin was supported by the FDGB. However, Union Berlin was able to trace its origins back to FC Olympia Oberschöneweide in 1906. BFC Dynamo had no history before East Germany. The supporters of Union Berlin therefore considered their club to be a genuine football club, unlike BFC Dynamo. However, even as a civilian club, Union Berlin was also part of the sports political system. The founding of the Union Berlin was organized by the then SED First Secretary in Köpenick Hans Modrow. Like Herbert Warnke, Hans Modrow would be a sponsoring member of the club. The most important positions on the board of Union Berlin were exclusively held by directors of state-owned factories or SED representatives. Union Berlin was state-funded and all decisions in club had to be reported to the all-powerful central sports agency DTSB. The DTSB stood in turn under direct control of the SED Central Committee.

The rivalry between BFC Dynamo and Union Berlin began in the mid-1960s. It was initially based on the geographical proximity to each other. BFC Dynamo and Union Berlin were two clubs from East Berlin in the DDR-Oberliga. BFC Dynamo struggled in the 1966-67 DDR-Oberliga and was threatened with relegation. The feud between the two clubs began when fans of Union Berlin mocked BFC Dynamo with a banner saying "We greet the relegated" during a league match at the Stadion an der Alten Försterei on 26 April 1967. Union Berlin won the match by 3–0 and BFC Dynamo was eventually relegated to the DDR-Liga at the end of the season. While BFC Dynamo was playing in the second tier DDR-Liga, Union Berlin surpisingly won the 1967–68 FDGB-Pokal. However, BFC Dynamo immediately bounced back and managed to establish itself in the DDR-Oberliga. Union Berlin would then itself be relegated to the DDR-Liga after the 1968-69 DDR-Oberliga, but also managed to return to the DDR-Oberliga after just one season in the second tier. Union Berlin would be the stronger of the two teams until the 1970s.

The rivalry between the two clubs intensified in the early 1970s. The player of Union Berlin, Klaus Korn, was suspended after a heated derby in the 1970–71 DDR-Oberliga at the Dynamo-Stadion im Sportforum on 28 October 1970. The performance of the referees had been "catastrophic" according to private notes from the then Second Club Secretary and Vice President of Union Berlin Günter Mielis, and the match ended with riots. Klaus Korn had insulted players in BFC Dynamo with slurs such as "Stasi-pig". The DFV Legal Commission imposed a one-year ban on Klaus Korn after a circumstantial trial. The DFV Legal Commission also demanded that Union Berlin considered his exclusion from the club. Klaus Korn was then excluded from the club and would never play in the DDR-Oberliga again. Unrest broke out again at a derby in Hohenschönhausen one year later. Eight spectators were arrested after the match between BFC Dynamo and Union Berlin in the 1971–72 DDR-Oberliga at the Dynamo-Stadion im Sportforum on 28 December 1971. The match was attended by 14,000 spectators and the stadium was sold out.

The football landscape in East Berlin changed before the 1971–72 season. Vorwärts Berlin was relocated to Frankfurt an der Oder on 31 July 1971. BFC Dynamo and Union Berlin were from now on the only major football clubs in East Berlin. The relocation meant that BFC Dynamo could now take over the role of the dominant team for the armed organs in East Berlin. The team would also have opportunity to eventually move into the larger and more centrally located Friedrich-Ludwig-Jahn-Sportpark, which led to increased interest in the club and growing attendance numbers. The districts in East Berlin had previously been divided between BFC Dynamo, Vorwärts Berlin and Union Berlin. Each club was able to recruit young players from training centers (TZ) in their districts. All training centers that had previously belonged to Vorwärts Berlin were now given to BFC Dynamo. The DTSB allegedly saw more potential in BFC Dynamo. BFC Dynamo now had access to two thirds of all training centers (TZ) in East Berlin. This meant that BFC Dynamo had gained a much stronger position in East Berlin than Union Berlin when it came to recruiting young players.  FC Vorwärts Frankfurt was given Bezirk Potsdam as a catchment area, in addition to Bezirk Frankfurt. Bezirk Potsdam had previously been assigned to Union Berlin and thus had to be handed over to Vorwärts Frankfurt. This further weakened Union Berlin in relation to BFC Dynamo.

Union Berlin was relegated to the DDR-Liga after the 1972–73 season. The Union Berlin star and national team player Reinhard Lauck was transferred to BFC Dynamo after the relegation. The loss of Lauck was a hard blow for the team. Lauck had contributed greatly to the victory in the final of the 1967–68 FDGB-Pokal and was well-liked among the supporters of Union Berlin. Supporters of Union Berlin are said to have gathered outside his apartment, to appeal to him to stay in the team and play in the second tier. But Lauck had already decided to change team. The DFV had allegedly advised him to switch to BFC Dynamo in order to continue playing in the national team. According to a regulation in the 1970 DFV Football Resolution, national team players in clubs that had been  relegated from the DDR-Oberliga should switch clubs in order to remain competitive. Lauck would make a successful appearance for East Germany in the 1974 FIFA World Cup and would win gold with East Germany in the 1976 Summer Olympics. Lauck became the team captain of BFC Dynamo in the 1974–75 season. He would later win two league titles with BFC Dynamo before ending his career due to a knee injury.

Union Berlin would remain in the DDR-Liga for several seasons. Instead of playing matches against BFC Dynamo in the DDR-Oberliga, the team was now left to compete with the reserve team of BFC Dynamo, the BFC Dynamo II. Union Berlin  would also suffer more blows which further weakened its position in relation to BFC Dynamo. Herbert Warnke passed in 1975 and was replaced as chairman of the FDGB by Harry Tisch. Harry Tisch had begun his political career in Rostock and chose instead to give the support of the FDGB to F.C. Hansa Rostock. Union Berlin thus lost the support of the FDGB and also no longer had any support in the top of the political hierarchy. The club could now only rely on support from the district administration of the SED in East Berlin and local state-owned enterprises, such as VEB Kabelwerk Oberspree (KWO) and VEB Transformatorenwerk Oberschöneweide (TRO).

The DTSB and the DFV had also continued their efforts to concentrate resources on a few clubs during the 1970s. A number of football clubs became specially promoted focus clubs in the 1970 DFV Football Resolution. The focus clubs were meant to be strengthened through player transfers. Players in teams that had been relegated from the DDR-Oberliga should also switch to focus clubs. The focus clubs were also equipped with more staff as well as better material and technical conditions. BFC Dynamo became the focus club in East Berlin.  Even more advantages were then given to the focus clubs in the 1976 DFV Football Resolution. The focus clubs would now be allowed to delegate youth players from other football clubs. They would also be provided with more youth coaches from the DFV and have the right to accommodate twice as many students in their affiliated Children and Youth Sports Schools (KJS) every year, compared to other football clubs.  Union Berlin would now have to delegate some of its best young players to BFC Dynamo. One example was the talented Detlef Helms, who was delegated to BFC Dynamo as a 17-year-old in 1977.

Union Berlin returned to the Oberliga in the 1976–77 season. Stadion an der Alten Försterei was a small football stadium without cinder tracks where the crowd stood close to the pitch. Union Berlin had become the focus of hooligan attention. Matches at the Stadion an der Alten Föresterei had regularly been interrupted by spectators throwing objects on the pitch. The derby between BFC Dynamo and Union Berlin was now such as heated affair that the matches were moved by the DFV to the neutral Stadion der Weltjugend in Mitte. It was considered that safety could not be guaranteed with the larger number of spectators. The Stadion an der Alten Försterei was known for its atmosphere and the Stadion der Weltjugend was located only a few minutes away from the home district of BFC Dynamo. The move was therefore seen as a major disadvantage by the fans to Union Berlin and further diluted their aversion to BFC Dynamo. Union Berlin defeated BFC Dynamo 1–0 in front of 45,000 spectators at the Stadion der Weltjugend in the first meeting of the 1976–77 season on 4 September 1976. Union Berlin also won the return match on 19 February 1977. The two wins against BFC Dynamo during the 1976–77 season cemented the reputation of Union Berlin as a cult club and crowd puller.

BFC Dynamo established itself as one of the top teams in the DDR-Oberliga from the mid-1970s. Union Berlin would come to play second fiddle in East Berlin from now on and never finish higher than seventh place in the DDR-Oberliga. In the shadow of BFC Dynamo, Union Berlin would no longer have any major sporting significance in East Germany. Union Berlin became a yo-yo team that hovered between the Oberliga and the DDR-Liga. Supporters of Union Berlin saw BFC Dynamo as the highest representative of the security organs and the police, with privileges in player recruitment and financial support as well as the political clout of Mielke. This was supposedly in contrast to their own club, which they regarded as an underdog rooted in the working class. BFC Dynamo would be disliked all over East Germany for its successes and its connection to the Stasi. This was also reflected in the derby between BFC Dynamo and Union Berlin. The supporters of Union Berlin were seen as oppositional. This is illustrated in the famous sentence of the editor-in-chief of the satirical magazine Eulenspiegel: "Not all Union fans are enemies of the state, but all enemies of the state are Union fans." But the fact that people supported Union Berlin did not automatically mean that they were against the state. Union Berlin got a lot of sympathy as the weaker club. There was a simple rule in East German football, where the least privileged club got the most sympathy. Supporters of Union Berlin cultivated the image of their club as the eternal underdog.

Clashes between the supporters of the two teams became increasingly common in the 1970s. Union Berlin had one of the most notorious followings in East Germany at this time. The supporters of Union Berlin often went to away matches in large numbers. Fights were initially won by the supporters of Union Berlin. They were in the clear majority and could chase the supporters of BFC Dynamo from the streets. A punch in the face and a stolen scarf was an experience for many young supporters of BFC Dynamo at this time. But BFC Dynamo gained more and more young supporters with its growing successes in the late 1970s. Many came from working-class families in Prenzlauer Berg. The supporters of BFC Dynamo would eventually begin to appear extremely well organized and began to fight back in the early 1980s. The tide now turned and the supporters of BFC Dynamo would win all fights between the supporters of the two teams from now on. Derbies at the Stadion der Weltjugend usually ended with a couple of hundred supporters of BFC Dynamo chasing the supporters of Union Berlin along Chausseestraße down towards the Friedrichsstrasse S-Bahn station. The fights often continued on the side streets of Friedrichstraße.

Union Berlin is sometimes portrayed as having been an opponent of the East German system and derbies between BFC Dynamo and Union Berlin during the East German era have been hyped as some kind of domestic political showdown. But Union Berlin was mostly just a club struggling against unfavorable conditions. The club had become disadvantaged by the state sports politics compared to local rival BFC Dynamo. Honorary President of Union Berlin Günter Mielis has said: "Union was not a club of resistance fighters, but we had to fight against a lot of political and economic resistance over and over again. We got strength from our fans". However, Union Berlin would eventually become known for a supporter scene that was anti-establishment, where dissidents could vent their disdain for the system in the anonymity of a crowd. Supporters of Union Berlin also saw themselves as stubborn and non-conformist, but this image should not be confused with actual resistance. Provocation was part of football in East Germany and people shouted out anything, because it was possible to get away with it. A critical attitude to the system was something that football supporters across East Germany had in common in the 1970s and 1980s.

Supporters of Union Berlin from the East German era concede that it is an exaggeration to call the club a "resistance club". A supporter of Union Berlin has said: "With the best of intentions, Union fans did not contribute to the overthrow of the GDR. No way, we were interested in football. There is the cliché about the club for the enemies of the state, but that wasn't us". There were no political groups among the supporters of Union Berlin. For some supporters of Union Berlin, the dissident reputation of Union Berlin is a legend that was created after Die Wende. A controversy erupted around Union Berlin in 2011 when it became publicly known that the then President of Union Berlin Dirk Zingler had been a member of the Stasi Guards Regiment "Felix E. Dzerzhinsky" for three years during his military service between 1983 and 1986. Zingler explained that he had sought to spend his military service in Berlin and claimed that he did not know beforehand that the regiment belonged to the Stasi. However, the Stasi Guards Regiment "Felix E. Dzerzhinsky” was an elite formation; it was not possible to simply apply for the regiment. The Stasi selected who it thought were best fit to serve with the regiment,  only accepting recruits that were "loyal to the line". Zingler had also been a member of the Socialist Unity Party (SED) and leader in the Free German Youth (FDJ) at the time. Union Berlin Press spokesman Christian Arbeit commented on the reports about Zingler in 2011 saying: "We do have a very unique history, compared to other clubs. But it wasn't us that always claimed we were this big anti-Stasi club. These are stories that get simplified in the media."

Most supporters of Union Berlin were just normal football supporters. Politics was not in the foreground. Supporters of Union Berlin from the era have testified that their support for the club had nothing to do with politics. The club was the most important thing and the identification with Union Berlin had primarily to do with Köpenick. The rivalry was fueled by local pride from the supporters of the two teams. However, the political dimension was there nontheless. BFC Dynamo was supported by the Stasi, who was disliked by many. But above all, it was the political instrumentalization of football that irritated  supporters of Union Berlin. The political favoritism of BFC Dynamo greatly contributed to the enthusiasm of the supporters of Union Berlin. Supporters of Union Berlin embraced the image of the underdog fighting the odds. An expression of the supporters of Union Berlin was: "Better to be a loser than a stupid Stasi pig".

The derby between BFC Dynamo and Union Berlin was first and foremost a local football derby. Both clubs had supporters who were not loyal to the line. Also supporters of BFC Dynamo were observed by the Stasi during the 1980s. East Berlin was divided into two: BFC Dynamo was more strongly represented in some parts, and Union Berlin was more strongly represented in other parts. Which team you supported was very much a question of where you lived. BFC Dynamo was the local team if you grew up in Prenzlauer Berg. And you lived in Mitte, you were also more likely to be a supporter BFC Dynamo, as the home stadium was only a stone's throw away along Schönhauser Allee. But Mitte was also a contested area. The border allegedly ran at Alexanderplatz, where many fights between the supporters of the two teams were fought. The home districts of the two clubs, Hohenschönhausen and Köpenick respectively, were always dangerous territory for supporters of the other team.

BFC Dynamo and Union Berlin met a total of 35 times in the DDR-Oberliga and the FDGB-Pokal. BFC Dynamo won 22 meetings and Union Berlin won 6 meetings. Matches against Union Berlin was often won with big numbers in the late 1970s and 1980s. BFC Dynamo defeated Union Berlin with 1–8 and then 7–1 in the round of 16 of the 1978-79 FDGB-Pokal. Hans-Jürgen Riediger scored a hat-trick in both legs. BFC Dynamo also defeated Union Berlin 8–1 in the Oberliga on 13 September 1986. Thom, Frank Pastor and Christian Backs scored two goals each. The 1980s was a crushing win for BFC Dynamo. Former BFC Dynamo midfielder Falko Götz concluded that: "Union was no opponent to us". The two teams met 13 times in the Oberliga and FDGB-Pokal during the 1980s. BFC Dynamo won 11 matches and two matches ended in a draw. The matches between the two local rivals were hard-fought on the pitch. Former BFC Dynamo midfielder Frank Terletzki has said that the victories against Union Berlin were always the best. But despite the rivalry between the clubs, it happened that players hung out outside of football. Former BFC Dynamo defender Frank Rohde has said that players of BFC Dynamo and Union Berlin often gathered to have a beer together after matches.

There were several transfers between the two clubs. BFC Dynamo recruited some of the best players of Union Berlin, such as Reinard Lauck in 1973, Detlef Helms in 1977 and Waldemar Ksienzyk in 1984. But there were also transfers in the other direction. Union Berlin predecessor TSC Oberschöneweide recruited Ralf Quest from SC Dynamo Berlin in 1962. Quest scored the winning goal for Union Berlin in the final of the 1967-68 FDGB-Pokal, when the club won a sensational cup victory.  Union Berlin would then recruit several players from BFC Dynamo over the years, such as Werner Heine in 1966, Werner Voigt, Bernd Kempke and Michael Jakob in 1973, Rainer Rohde in 1976, Rainer Wroblewski in 1977, Olaf Seier in 1983, Ralf Sträßer in 1984, Olaf Hirsch in 1986, Norbert Trieloff in 1987, Mario Maek in 1988, and Marco Kostmann and Thomas Grether in 1989, and Bernd Schulz in 1990. Union Berlin recruited a couple of players from BFC Dynamo in the 1980s who did some of their best seasons at the club. Olaf Seier became the team captain of Union Berlin and Ralf Sträßer became first and only player in Union Berlin to ever become league top goal scorer during the East German era. Mario Maek saved Union Berlin from relegation with a late 3–2 goal against FC Karl-Marx-Stadt in the last match day of the 1987-88 DDR-Oberliga. As many as three former players of BFC Dynamo were involved in the winning goal for Union Berlin.

Union Berlin played in the DDR-Liga in the 1989–90 season. FC Berlin and Union Berlin met in the second round of the 1990-91 FDGB-Pokal at the Stadion an der Alten Försterei on 23 September 1990. It was the first match between the teams since the fall of the Berlin Wall. BFC Dynamo, now named FC Berlin, had now already lost many of its former top-performers to the West German Bundesliga.  Hooligans of FC Berlin stormed the home stands and attacked supporters of Union Berlin with clubs and flares at the beginning of the match. Union Berlin won the match 2–1 on extra-time. It was the first win for Union Berlin against FC Berlin since 1977. Thomas Grether scored the first goal and Olaf Seier scored the winning goal for Union Berlin in the match. Both players had been brought up in the youth department of BFC Dynamo and had played matches for BFC Dynamo in the DDR-Oberliga.  Clashes between supporters of the two teams continued in the city after the match. Serious riots broke out in East Berlin, involving hundreds of supporters.

FC Berlin and Union Berlin then met in the promotion round to the 2. Bundesliga in the 1990–91 season. FC Berlin lost the first match 1–0 away in the second round at the Stadion an der Alten Försterei on 8 June 1991. Former BFC Dynamo player Bernd Schulz scored the winning goal for Union Berlin. FC Berlin then defeated Union Berlin 2–0 in the return match in fifth round in front of 9,475 spectators at the Friedrich-Ludwig-Jahn-Sportpark on 18 June 1991. Heiko Bonan and Thorsten Boer scored one goal each in the match. FC Berlin was only one point behind leader BSG Stahl Brandenburg before the last round. The team managed to defeat Magdeburg 3–5 away on 23 June 1991. However, BSG Stahl Brandenburg defeated Union Berlin 2–0 away. FC Berlin thus finished in second place and missed promotion. Some supporters of BFC Dynamo are convinced that Union Berlin deliberately lost in order to prevent FC Berlin from advancing to the 2. Bundesliga. FC Berlin and Union Berlin then also met in the promotion round for the 2. Bundesliga in 1991–92 season. FC Berlin won the first match 3–0 at home in the third round on 31 May 1992. The team then also won the return match 0–4 away in the fourth round on 7 June 1992.

The two teams met again in the new Regionalliga Nordost that was formed in 1994–95 season. FC Berlin under coach Werner Voigt lost 0–6 to 1. FC Union Berlin in the 1996–97 Regionalliga Nordost at the Stadion im Sportforum on 28 September 1996. It was the biggest defeat so far to Union Berlin. Former FC Berlin player Thorsten Boer scored two goals for Union Berlin in the match. The two teams met 12 times in total in Regionalliga Nordost between 1994 and 2000. BFC Dynamo won one match and Union Berlin won eight matches. The two teams then met in the round of 16 of the 2000-01 Berlin Cup. The match was played in front of 4,427 spectators at the Friedrich-Ludwig-Jahn-Sportpark on 24 March 2001. Union Berlin won the match 0-3. Riots broke out among supporters of BFC Dynamo in Prenzlauer Berg after the match. The police had to deploy water cannons to control the situation.  The most recent meetings between BFC Dynamo and Union Berlin occurred in the 2005–06 NOFV-Oberliga Nord. The first match was played at the Stadion an der Alten Försterei on 21 August 2015.  BFC Dynamo was missing striker Danny Kukulies and first-choice goalkeeper Nico Thomaschewski before the match. Kukulies was suspended and Thomaschewski injured. German police and members of the SEK carried out a controversial raid against supporters of BFC Dynamo the night before the match. Club management initially considered withdrawing from the match. The players voted on whether or not to play the match against Union Berlin. More than 1,000 police officers were deployed to the match.  BFC Dynamo eventually lost 8–0. The return match was played at the Stadion im Sportforum on 13 May 2006. The score was 1–1 when around 200 supporters of BFC Dynamo stormed the pitch to attack supporters of Union Berlin. Supporters of Union Berlin fled the guest block in panic. The match was abandoned and Union Berlin was awarded a 2–0 victory. The two teams has not met since then.

BFC Dynamo met the reserve team of Union Berlin six times in the NOFV-Oberliga Nord and Regionalliga Nordost between 2010 and 2015. Union Berlin II won the first five matches. The last match was played in the 2014-15 Regionalliga Nordost on 15 March 2015. BFC Dynamo defeated Union Berlin II 1–0 in front of 8,169 spectators at Stadion an der Alten Försterei. The match was interrupted for 18 minutes when supporters of Union Berlin tried to attack the supporters of BFC Dynamo. 112 police officers were  injured and 175 supporters were arrested during the match. Some media reported that 300 supporters of Union Berlin had participated in the attack on guest supporters. Journalist Frank Willmann attended the match and claims that the number was rather 30. He also said he did not see any injured police. There have been several cases of violence between the supporters of the two teams during the 2010s. Around a hundred hooligans from Union Berlin tried to attack a senior tournament organized by BFC Dynamo in the Dynamo-Sporthalle on 30 January 2010. Also women and children got in the way of the attack. Around 30 partially masked supporters from Union Berlin attacked players and a small group of supporters of BFC Dynamo in connection with a senior match between Union Berlin and BFC Dynamo on Hämmerlingstraße in Köpenick on 27 March 2015. One player of BFC Dynamo and two guest spectators were injured. A number of supporters of BFC Dynamo joined Hertha BSC in the guest block of the Stadion an der Alten Försterei during the derby between Union Berlin and Hertha BSC on 2 November 2019.

Organization

Current board and management

Presidential history

Players

Current squad

Notable past players

Many players of BFC Dynamo of the 1970s and 1980s played for the East Germany national team. Some would later become players or coaches in the Bundesliga and play for Germany national team.

The list includes players with 100 appearances for SC Dynamo Berlin and BFC Dynamo at professional level and who have also played for their national team. The flag indicates the national team they last played for. The players are sorted chronologically by the date of their first appearance with the first team of SC Dynamo Berlin or BFC Dynamo.

Coaches

Current staff

Coach history

SC Dynamo Berlin had six different coaches until the founding of BFC Dynamo in 1966. The first coach was Helmut Petzold, who was delegated along with the team of Dynamo Dresden to Dynamo Berlin and took office on 21 November 1954. Other coaches of Dynamo Berlin were Istvan Orczifalvi, Fritz Bachmann, János Gyarmati and Fritz Gödicke. Fritz Bachmann served as coach of Dynamo Berlin during the successful 1959 season.

Honours

BFC Dynamo was the most successful club in the DDR-Oberliga. The club won ten consecutive championships. That is a feat no other team in East Germany has matched. The DDR-Oberliga was rebranded as the NOFV-Oberliga from the 1990–91 season. The league was then replaced by the Bundesliga as the highest competition when East Germany joined West Germany to form the reunited Germany.

Domestic
 East German Champions
 Winners: (10) 1978–79, 1979–80, 1980–81, 1981–82, 1982–83, 1983–84, 1984–85, 1985–86, 1986–87, 1987–88 (record)
Runners-up: (4) 1960, 1971–72, 1975–76, 1988–89
 FDGB-Pokal
 Winners: (3) 1959, 1987–88, 1988–89
 Runners-up: (6) 1961–62, 1970–71, 1978–79, 1981–82, 1983–84, 1984–85 
 DFV-Supercup
 Winners: 1989
 Fuwo-Pokal (de)
Runners-up: 1972
 DDR-Liga (II)
 Winners: 1957,
 DDR-Liga Nord (II)
 Winners: 1967–68
 DDR-Liga B (II)
 Winners: 1971–72 
 Runners-up: 1974–75
 DDR-Liga A (II)
 Winners: 1984–85

International
 European Cup
 Quarter-finals: 1979–80, 1983–84
 European Cup Winners' Cup
 Semi-finals: 1971–72

Double
 DDR-Oberliga and FDGB-Pokal
 Winners: 1988

Regional
 Bezirksliga Berlin (III)
 Winners: 1983–84
Regionalliga Nordost (IV)
 Winners: 2021–22
NOFV-Oberliga Nord (III-V)
 Winners: 1991–92, 2000–01, 2013–14
 Runners-up: 2008–09, 2009–10
Berlin-Liga (V)
 Winners: 2003–04
Berlin Cup (III-VII)
 Winners: (7) 1998–99, 2010–11, 2012–13, 2014–15, 2016–17, 2017–18, 2020–21
 Runners-up: 1999–00, 2009–10

Seasons

European competitions

European record

Youth department
BFC Dynamo is known for a recognized youth work. The club had 23 youth teams in the 2021–22 season. There were 68 trainers and supervisors responsible for the youth teams in the club during the season. The youth teams range from U7 to U19 teams. The U17 team competes in the third tier B-Junior Verbandsliga Berlin and the U19 team competes in second tier A-Junior Regionalliga Nordost. The youth teams are based in the Sportforum Hohenschönhausen.

There were more than 800 children and youth players in the club as of 2019. Many children in the club comes from immigrant backgrounds or socially disadvantaged families. BFC Dynamo helped football club FC Berlin 23 from neighbouring Storkower Straße in September 2021 and saved more than 40 to 50 children from the club, which was about to be dissolved.

The club launched the so-called "Kita-projekt" in 2003. The Kita-projekt is a day care project that gives boys and girls aged 3 to 6 the opportunity to participate in sports on a regular basis. The Kita-projekt involved approximately 200 children from 16 day care centers in Berlin as of 2020. The majority of the children come from the localities or former boroughs of Lichtenberg, Hohenschönhausen, Karlshorst, Mitte, Weißensee and Pankow. The Kita-projekt was the first of its kind in Germany and has received several awards for its work with children. The former professional player of BFC Dynamo Jörn Lenz is the head of the Kita-projekt as of 2021.

The so-called "Jugendförderverein" was founded in 2004. It is a registered voluntary association that aims to promote youth sports at BFC Dynamo. The Jugendförderverein has supported youth teams with equipment, covered costs for trips to tournaments and helped youth trainers to be able to obtain their trainer license. The Jugendförderverein relies on donations and voluntary work. Former Club President Mario Weinkauf was one of the seven founding members of the Jugenförderverein and briefly served as chairman of the association before he became club president. Weinkauf had also been a youth trainer in the club for some time.

Youth academy during East German era
BFC Dynamo had a very successful youth academy during the East German era. The youth department had full-time trainers available for all youth classes and access to the best material conditions in the Dynamo-Sportforum. Youth coaches were highly qualified and training in the Children and Youth Sports School (KJS) was extensive. The youth work at BFC Dynamo during the East German era was described as "absolutely leading" by former coach Jürgen Bogs, who had a background as coach of the junior team. It was also described as "exquisite" by former German sports journalist Horst Friedemann, who worked for Deutsches Sportecho and Kicker. 
 
The upper tier of elite clubs in East Germany had privileged access to talents within designated geographical and administrative areas. All designated football clubs were assigned one or two regional districts in East Germany as catchment areas at their founding. BFC Dynamo was initially assigned Bezirk Cottbus and one third of all training centers (TZ) in East Berlin. The club was then allowed to take over the training centers in East Berlin that had previously belonged to the catchment area of FC Vorwärts Berlin, when FC Vorwärts Berlin was relocated to Frankfurt an der Oder before the 1971-72 season.

BFC Dynamo, as well as FC Vorwärts Berlin and SG Dynamo Dresden, also had another structural advantage when it came to recruiting young players. Most sports associations (SV) were dissolved at the founding of the DTSB in 1957. However, sports associations SV Dynamo and ASV Vorwärts were allowed to continue exist. A decision in the SED Politburo in 1962 then stipulated that the sports associations SV Dynamo and ASV Vorwärts were allowed to set up sports communities in each location where they operated offices. This meant that the SV Dynamo and ASV Vorwärts would be able to run sports communities across the country. BFC Dynamo would eventually be able recruit talents from the youth departments of all sports communities (SG) of SV Dynamo in East Germany, except those in Bezirk Dresden and a number of sports communities in the southern regional districts that belonged to the catchment area of SG Dynamo Dresden.

SV Dynamo would operate numerous training centers (TZ) across the whole of East Germany. The training centers were either assigned to BFC Dynamo or SG Dynamo Dresden, depending on catchment area. Training in these training centers were better than elsewere. The work in the training centers was supervised and directed by BFC Dynamo. The best talents from the individual training centers were then brought together and selected in multi-day screening session.  BFC Dynamo would effectively come to benefit from a nationwide scouting network, which included 33 training centers (TZ) of SV Dynamo and the partnership with Bezirk Cottbus. In total, BFC Dynamo had access to 38 training centers (TZ) across East Germany for the recruitment of talents. As a comparison, Union Berlin had only access to six training centers (TZ), all of which were located in the Berlin area.

A number of football clubs became specially promoted focus clubs in the 1970 DFV Football Resolution. The focus clubs would receive additional financial support from the DTSB and other advantages. Focus clubs were also allowed delegate youth players from other football clubs in the 1976 DFV Football Resolution. BFC Dynamo became the focus club in East Berlin. As a focus club, BFC Dynamo also had the right to delegate 12 students to its affiliated Children and Youth Sports Schools (KJS) every year. Non-focus football clubs only had the right to delegate six students to their affiliated Children and Youth Sports School (KJS) every year. The elite Children and Youth Sports School (KJS) "Werner Seelenbinder" provided boarding and schooling for talented players in the Sportforum. The Children and Youth Sports School (KJS) "Werner Seelenbinder" was affiliated to sports club SC Dynamo Berlin.

The success of BFC Dynamo during the East German era was based on the club's extensive youth work. In 1975, there were as many as five national team players in the East Germany junior national football team among the club's youth players from the class of 1957. Only a fifth of the players who won the ten East German championships with BFC Dynamo were older than 18 years when they joined the club. The youth academy produced stars such as Lutz Eigendorf, Falko Götz and Andreas Thom. Most of the top performers of BFC Dynamo in the 1980s came through the club's own youth teams, including Hans-Jürgen Riediger, Norbert Trieloff, Bodo Rudwaleit, Ralf Sträßer, Artur Ullrich, Rainer Ernst, Bernd Schulz, Christian Backs, Frank Rohde, Falko Götz, Jan Voß, Andreas Thom, Jörg Fügner, Hendrik Herzog and Marco Köller. Several former players of SC Dynamo Berlin and BFC Dynamo became youth trainers in the club after ending their playing careers, such as Herbert Schoen, Günter Schröter, Hermann Bley, Martin Skaba, Peter Rohde, Werner Voigt, Hartmut Pelka and Hans-Jürgen Riediger.

Numerous players from East Germany joined West German clubs at the end of East Germany. Many came from BFC Dynamo. More than 110 players who had been trained in East Germany, primarily in a Children and Youth Sports School (KJS), would go on to play for West German or West Berlin clubs in the Bundesliga after the end of East Germany. German author Michael Peter has created a database for all players who had been trained in East Germany and who played for West German or West Berlin football clubs after 1990. For players born before 1976, BFC Dynamo was the  biggest contributor. 98 players, born before 1976, came from the ten designated football clubs and SG Dynamo Dresden. 18 of these, came from BFC Dynamo.

Honours
Next Generation Oberliga (de)
Winners: 1981, 1991
 Runners-up (6): 1979, 1983
East German Junior Championship (de)
 Winners: (5) 1960, 1978, 1979, 1987, 1991
 Runners-up (6): 1967, 1974, 1976, 1977, 1988, 1989
East German Youth Championship (Youth FDJ-Pokal) (de)
 Winners: (4) 1967, 1972, 1975, 1987
 Runners-up: 1983, 1989
East German Junior Cup (Junge Welt-Pokal) (de)
 Winners: (5) 1966, 1967, 1987, 1989, 1990 (record)
East German Youth Cup (Youth FDGB-Pokal)
 Winners: (5) 1965, 1968, 1971, 1972, 1976 (record)

Affiliated clubs

The following East German sports communities have been affiliated with SC Dynamo Berlin and BFC Dynamo:

  SG Dynamo Berlin-Mitte (1954–1955)
  SG Dynamo Hohenschönhausen (1957–1966)
  SG Dynamo Fürstenwalde (1971–1990)

Explanatory notes

References

Further reading
 
 Bertram, Marco (2015). BFC Dynamo Fußballfibel (in German), Berlin: CULTURCON medien. .
 
 
 Gläser, Andreas (2003). Der BFC war schuld am Mauerbau: Ein stolzer Sohn des Proletariats erzählt (in German). Berlin: Aufbau Taschenbuch. .
 Karas, Steffen (2020). 66 Jahre BFC Dynamo – Auswärts mit 'nem Bus (in German), Berlin: CULTURCON Medien. .
 Leske, Hanns (2004). Erich Mielke, die Stasi und das runde Leder: Der Einfluß der SED und des Ministeriums für Staatssicherheit auf den Fußballsport in der DDR (in German). Bielefeld: Verlag Die Werkstatt. .
 Luther, Jörn; Willmann, Frank (2003). BFC Dynamo – Der Meisterclub (in German). Berlin: Das Neue Berlin. .
 McDougall, Alan (2014). The People's Game: Football, State and Society in East Germany. Cambridge: Cambridge University Press. .
 Schramm, Jochen (1995).  Riot Boys! (in German) Cologne: KRASH-Verlag. .
 
 Willmann, Frank; Hahn, Anne (2007). Stadionpartisanen – Fans und Hooligans in der DDR (in German). Berlin: Neues Leben. .
 Willmann, Frank; Hauswald, Harald (2008). Ultras Kutten Hooligans: Fußballfans in Ost-Berlin (in German). Berlin: Jaron Verlag. .

External links

  
 BFC Online – Fan site with news and fan forum 
 BFC-Fotos – Photos from the 2015–16 season by official club photographer Patrick Skrzipek 
 BFC Historie – Fan photos from 1965 
 Mythos Online Redaktion – Fan photos from 2016 
 Large collection of fan photos 
 Facts and Figures 

 
1966 establishments in East Germany
Association football clubs established in 1966
Dynamo Berlin
Football clubs in East Germany
Football clubs in Germany
Police association football clubs in Germany
Politics and sports
Football Club
SV Dynamo